Tigercat is the Grumman F7F Tigercat, an American heavy fighter aircraft.

Tigercat or tiger cat may also refer to:

 Tigercat (sailboat), a 1960s catamaran sailboat
 Hamilton Tiger-Cats, a Canadian football team
 Tigercat missile, a mobile land-based version of the Sea Cat
 Tiger cat or oncilla, a small spotted cat
 "Tiger Cat" (Tom and Jerry Tales), an episode of the cartoon series Tom and Jerry Tales
 Tiger quoll, also known as the "tiger cat", an Australian marsupial

See also
 Tiger catshark, a species of catshark